Rancho El Caracol Airfield  is a private paved airstrip located in Rancho "El Caracol", South of El Vizcaíno in the Municipality of Mulegé, Baja California Sur, Mexico.

It is to the west of the Federal Highway 1. This ranch is where the famous "Leche el Caracol" (El caracol brand milk) is produced.

The airfield is used solely for general aviation  purposes. Some times the COL code is used as identifier.

References

Airports in Baja California Sur
Mulegé Municipality